The Rentals are an American rock band fronted by vocalist Matt Sharp. Sharp has been the only consistent member since the group's inception. The band's best selling single is "Friends of P" (1995). The Rentals released two albums, Return of the Rentals (1995) and Seven More Minutes (1999) on Maverick Records before quietly splitting in 1999 following a world tour. The group reformed in 2005 and have since released several EPs and two more full-length albums, Lost in Alphaville and Q36. Lost in Alphaville released August 26, 2014, on Polyvinyl Records. Q36 was released June 26, 2020. Numerous musicians have appeared with the group on recordings and in live shows. The group's most recent iteration consists of Sharp, Nick Zinner, and Ronnie Vannucci Jr.

History 
Matt Sharp founded the Rentals in early 1994. They released their debut album Return of the Rentals the following year, which featured the radio hit "Friends of P". The accompanying music video was shot with antiquated equipment, on black and white film stock, with a total budget of less than $1,000. Upon its release, the video was added to MTV's playlist in early November 1995.

Band members on Return of the Rentals included Patrick Wilson (also of Weezer) on drums, Rod Cervera (guitar), Tom Grimley (keyboards), Petra Haden (violin, vocals), and Cherielynn Westrich (vocals, Moog). Petra's triplet sister Rachel Haden appears as an additional vocalist. After Sharp left Weezer, Wilson's studio replacement on the drums was Kevin March, and Mike Fletcher was the band's most frequent touring drummer. Maya Rudolph, of Saturday Night Live fame, also handled keyboard and backing vocals for the group's first tours in support of its debut album. The group headlined its own club shows, and also hit larger venues, as the opening act for such well-established acts as Alanis Morissette, Garbage, Blur, and the Red Hot Chili Peppers.

Return

On October 24, 2005, the tenth anniversary of the band's first album's release, Sharp announced he was bringing back the Rentals after a six-year absence.

In June 2008, Sara Radle announced her departure from the group to focus on her band Calamity Magnet.<On September 27, 2008, the Rentals released a new song titled "Colorado" on the band's official website.

Songs About Time
On January 1, 2009, the Rentals announced their new yearlong multimedia project, Songs About Time.

Resilience
On April 12, 2011, the Rentals released an album titled Resilience. This was (as their official website states) originally recorded as part of the Songs About Time project, as accompanying music to the 'Films About Weeks' videos. The album was originally titled Tokyo Blues but renamed Resilience as a commentary on the band's perception of the character and resilience of the Japanese people after the Japanese tsunami and earthquake disaster. The band played both dates of the 2011 Nano Mugen festival in Japan.

Q36
On October 4, 2017, Sharp announced that he had started work on the Rentals' fourth studio album with a potential release date in the first half of 2018. "The new record is a collaboration between myself, Nick Zinner and Dave Fridmann with a little help from a makeshift choir of incredible singers that I affectionately like to refer to as The Gentle Assassins." In the same announcement he revealed the new song "Elon Musk Is Making Me Sad" which was shared with the help of Wired.  The album was released on June 26, 2020 and physically in December 2020 due to manufacturing and shipping issues.

Discography

Studio albums

 Return of the Rentals (1995)
 Seven More Minutes (1999)
 Lost in Alphaville (2014)
 Q36 (2020)

References

External links

Allmusic entry for the Rentals

American rock music groups
Musical groups established in 1995